Evan Hershey Helmuth (May 18, 1977 – July 17, 2017) was an American film and television actor. Helmuth was best known for his lead role as Father David Keane in the 2012 horror film, The Devil Inside. His other film credits included Fever Pitch in 2005, in which he played Jimmy Fallon's best friend, Ready or Not in 2009, and Jobs in 2013.

Biography

Early life 
Helmuth was born May 18, 1977, to John William Helmuth and Kerry O’Brien Helmuth. He was raised in Reston, Virginia until the age of 10, when his family moved to Ames, Iowa. Helmuth initially attended arts camp at Interlochen Center for the Arts in Interlochen, Michigan for several summers before enrolling at Interlochen's full-time high school arts academy for three years.  He graduated from Interlochen as a theater major in 1995.

Helmuth studied at the University of Southern California's School of Dramatic Arts, where he received his bachelor's degree in 1999 as the recipient of USC's Jack Nicholson Award for outstanding actor. While attending USC, Helmuth met writer and producer Josh Appelbaum, who later co-wrote the 2005 episode of the television series, Alias, that featured Helmuth as a guest star.

Career 
Helmuth worked in film and television following his graduation from the University of Southern California, including Garfield: The Movie in 2004.

In 2005, Helmuth appeared in the Farrelly brothers' romantic comedy, Fever Pitch, as Troy, the best friend and sidekick of Jimmy Fallon's character. Helmuth later co-starred in the 2009 independent comedy, Ready or Not, alongside Christian Oliver and Seamus Dever.
 
Helmuth was best known for his lead role as Father David Keane in the 2012 horror film, The Devil Inside, directed by William Brent Bell. The film, which stars Fernanda Andrade, Helmuth, and Simon Quarterman, was produced on a shoestring budget. However, the film debuted with a surprising $34.5 million to win its opening weekend in January 2012.

Most recently, Helmuth appeared in the 2013 biopic, Jobs.

In addition to his spot on Alias, Helmuth's television credits included guest roles on NCIS (2006), Bones (2012), Rizzoli & Isles (2012), Perception (2013), and Battle Creek (2015).

Death 
Helmuth died at the age of 40 on July 17, 2017, in Los Angeles, California, after complications from a stroke.

Filmography

Film

Television

Video games

References

External links 
 

1977 births
2017 deaths
21st-century American male actors
American male film actors
American male television actors
USC School of Dramatic Arts alumni
Male actors from Virginia
Male actors from Iowa
People from Reston, Virginia
People from Ames, Iowa
Male actors from Los Angeles